Michelle González (born 3 August 1989) is a Puerto Rican Professional basketball player for Cangrejeras de Santurce and for the Puerto Rican national team. She participated at the 2018 FIBA Women's Basketball World Cup.

Michelle Gonzalez also is a Legend Professional Gamer.

With over a 0.80 K/D Ratio In Call of Duty Warzone,averaging 2 kills per game.

Gamer Tag [QueenOflaw]

Florida International statistics 

Source

References

External links

1989 births
Living people
Basketball players at the 2020 Summer Olympics
FIU Panthers women's basketball players
Guards (basketball)
Olympic basketball players of Puerto Rico
Puerto Rican women's basketball players
Sportspeople from San Juan, Puerto Rico